Slut-shaming is the practice of criticizing people, especially women and girls, who are perceived to violate expectations of behavior and appearance regarding issues related to sexuality. The term is used to reclaim the word slut and empower women and girls to have agency over their own sexuality. It may also be used in reference to gay men, who may face disapproval for promiscuous sexual behaviors. Slut-shaming rarely happens to heterosexual men.

Examples of slut-shaming include being criticized or punished for: violating dress code policies by dressing in sexually provocative ways; requesting access to birth control; having premarital, extramarital, casual, or promiscuous sex; or engaging in prostitution. It can also include being victim-blamed for being raped or otherwise sexually assaulted.

Definitions and characteristics 

Slut-shaming involves criticizing women for their transgression of accepted codes of sexual conduct, i.e., admonishing them for behavior, attire or desires that are more sexual than society finds acceptable. Author Jessalynn Keller stated, "The phrase [slut-shaming] became popularized alongside the SlutWalk marches and functions similarly to the 'War on Women,' producing affective connections while additionally working to reclaim the word 'slut' as a source of power and agency for girls and women."

Slut-shaming is used by men and women. Women who slut-shame other women continuously apply unfavorable sexual double standards. The term is also used to describe victim blaming for rape and other sexual assault. This blaming is done by stating the crime was caused (either in part or in full) by the woman wearing revealing clothing or acting in a sexually provocative manner, before refusing consent to sex, thereby absolving the perpetrator of guilt. Sexually lenient individuals can be at risk of social isolation.

The action of slut-shaming can be a form of social punishment and is an aspect of sexism, as well as female intrasexual competition. Slut-shaming is a form of intrasexual competition because the term "slut" reduces the value of a woman. Being termed a "slut" is against a woman's gender norms.

The social movement falls into the category of feminism. This raises controversy because gender roles have a significant role in the social movement. The topic of slut-shaming sheds light on the social issues that are associated with the double standard. This is because slut-shaming is commonly aimed toward women, and not men. Slut-shaming is common in America because it is such a high-context culture, which means it is easier to be victim blamed.

Researchers from Cornell University found that sentiments similar to slut-shaming appeared in a nonsexual, same-sex friendship context as well. The researchers had college women read a vignette describing an imaginary female peer, "Joan", then rate their feelings about her personality. To one group of women, Joan was described as having two lifetime sexual partners; to another group, she had had 20 partners. The study found that women—even women who were more promiscuous themselves—rated the Joan with 20 partners as "less competent, emotionally stable, warm, and dominant" than the Joan with two.

Society and culture

History 
There is no documented date of origin for the term slut-shaming; nor the act of it. Rather, although the act of slut-shaming has existed for centuries, discussion of it has grown out of social and cultural relations and the trespassing of boundaries of what is considered normative and acceptable behavior. Second wave of feminism contributed significantly to the definition and act of slut-shaming. Tracing back to the Industrial Revolution and the Second World War, men's gender roles were that of the breadwinner. Men made up a majority of the labor force while women were socialized and taught to embrace the cult of domesticity and homemaking. Author Emily Poole argues that the sexual revolution of the 1960s and 1970s increased the rate of both birth control use and premarital sex. Moreover, feminist writers during the 1960s and 1970s such as Betty Friedan, Gloria Steinem, and Kate Millett encouraged women to be more open about their sexuality in public settings.

Slut-shaming has correlation to an individual's socio-economic status, which is characterized by wealth, education, and occupation. In the 18th century, "slut" was a common term used by men and upper-class women to degrade lower-class female servants. The context behind upper-class women and men calling their servants a "slut" includes when the servants were being sexually assaulted by their male employers. Upper-class women calling other women "sluts" proved their adherence to their socio-economic status over their gender.

Modern society 
Slut-shaming is prevalent on social media platforms, including the most commonly used: YouTube, Instagram, Twitter, and Facebook. Slut-shaming has occurred on Facebook in controversial exchanges between users that have resulted in convictions to menace, harass and cause offense.

It has been reported by The Pew Research Center that the most common targets of harassment on the Internet are often young women. Citing that 50% of young female respondents have been called offensive names and or shamed online. In particular, those who were 18 to 24 years of age experienced varying amounts of severe harassment at astoundingly high rates. Women who have been stalked online were at 26%, while the targets of online sexual harassment were at 25%.

In the Women Studies International Forum, researcher Jessica Megarry used the Twitter hashtag campaign #mencallmethings as a case study of online sexual harassment. Women used the hashtag to report harassment they received from men, including insults related to appearance, name calling, rape threats, and death threats.

One example of a character in literature who has been described as being a recipient of 'slut-shaming' is the character Lily Bart in Edith Wharton's House of Mirth.

Media 

The SlutWalk protest march had its origins in Toronto in response to an incident when a Toronto Police officer told a group of students that they could avoid sexual assault by not dressing like "'sluts'". Amber Rose's second annual walk in Los Angeles in 2016 had "several hundred" participants. A similar event occurred in Washington DC in 2014.

The Slut Walk movement has embraced the slut-shame label and has engaged in an act of resignification. Ringrose et al. call the Slut Walk a "collective movement" where the focus goes back to the perpetrator and no longer rests on the victim. This act of resignification comes from the work of feminist scholar Judith Butler. In her 1997 work, she argued that labels do not just name and marginalize individuals to categories, but also open up an opportunity for resistance.

Krystal Ball characterized the comments of Rush Limbaugh during the Rush Limbaugh–Sandra Fluke controversy as follows: "If you are a woman who stands up for your rights, you are a slut and your parents should be ashamed of you and we should all have the right to view your sex tapes online. This type of despicable behavior is part and parcel of a time-worn tradition of Slut-Shaming. When women step out line [sic], they are demeaned and degraded into silence. If you say Herman Cain sexually harassed you, you are a slut. If you say Supreme Court Justice Clarence Thomas sexually harassed you, you are a slut."

Slut-shaming has been used as a form of bullying on social media, with some people using revenge pornography tactics to spread intimate photos without consent. In 2012, a teenager from California, Audrie Pott, was sexually assaulted by three boys at a party. She committed suicide eight days after photos of her being assaulted were distributed among her peer group.

James Miller, editor-in-chief of the Ludwig von Mises Institute of Canada, wrote a controversial article defending slut shaming. The article was later taken down, but still received criticism from some libertarians, such as Gina Luttrell of Thoughts on Liberty, an all-female libertarian blog.

Comedians Krystyna Hutchinson and Corinne Fischer of Sorry About Last Night host a podcast entitled Guys We Fucked, The Anti-slut shaming podcast. This podcast has over 200,000 listeners on each episode that is on SoundCloud. The podcast exists to de-stigmatize discussing sex so that slut-shaming becomes less of an issue. Hutchinson told The Huffington Post: "We want to make people feel more comfortable in their own skin. We just got a message from a girl from New Delhi, India, about how she loves the podcast because it makes her feel like it's OK to be comfortable with your sexuality and enjoy sex. And that made me so happy".

Activism 
Activism against slut-shaming takes place worldwide. Participants have covered their bodies in messages reading "Don't Tell Me How to Dress" and "I am not a slut but I like having consensual sex" and march under a giant banner with the word slut on it. Activism has occurred in Vancouver, New York City, Rio, Jerusalem, Hong Kong, and others.

In 2008, hundreds of South African women protested at the local taxi rank wearing miniskirts and t-shirts that read, "Pissed-Off Women" after a taxi driver and multiple hawkers confronted a young girl about wearing a short denim miniskirt and penetrated her with their fingers, calling her "slut" repeatedly. Protesters wanted to make their message clear; they wanted men to stop harassing women, no matter how short their skirts were and that no matter how short it may be, it is never an invitation.

After the gang rape of an unconscious 16-year-old girl in Steubenville, Ohio, August 2012, football players spread videos of the assault to other classmates, some of whom posted the videos to Twitter and Instagram. The pictures and video were later removed by authorities; however, that did not stop people from hash-tagging "Whore status" or "I have no sympathy for whores" in their tweets. Members of the collective Anonymous reported names of the rapists and classmates who spread the footage to local authorities. They took to the streets and internet requesting help from the community to bring justice to the Jane Doe who was raped.

Members of The Arts Effect All-Girl Theater Company have developed a play, Slut: The Play, in which they address the damaging impact of slut-shaming and slut culture. The creators state that their play "is a call to action – a reminder" that slut-shaming is happening every day, almost everywhere. Slut is inspired by real-life experiences of 14- to 17-year-old girls from New York, New Jersey, Connecticut, and Pennsylvania. The play was shown at the 2013 New York Fringe Festival.

In her statement on the production, and of slut-shaming in general, author of Slut! Growing Up Female with a Bad Reputation, Leora Tanenbaum writes:

After experiencing slut-shaming firsthand, Olivia Melville, Paloma Brierly Newton and approximately a dozen other Australian women founded the organization, Sexual Violence Won't Be Silenced, on August 25, 2015. The association seeks to raise awareness of cyber-bullying and online sexual violence. The founders also launched a petition to the Australian government, requesting that they better train and educate law enforcement officers on how to prevent and punish violent harassment on social media.

Among gay and bisexual men 
Gay and bisexual men are also victimized through slut-shaming because of their sexual activity. There has been research supporting that LGBT students were more likely to be bullied and called sluts than heterosexual students. Researchers discussed how these negative experiences of victimization by peers, friends and strangers can lead to physical harm, social shaming, and loss of friendships. Unlike heterosexual people, LGBT people are more likely to learn about safe sex practices from friends. Gay and bisexual men are at highest risk of HIV. Most of the education that young gay and bisexual men receive about safe sex practices is learned from friends, the Internet, hearsay or trial and error.

Criticism of non-heterosexual men's sexual activity can either be said in a humorous context or not. Judgementalism happens when someone mentions gay men's sexual risk behavior or that they have multiple sex partners. This implies that their behavior is "slutty" and dirty.

Street harassment includes cat-calling, victim blaming, and slut shaming. Judgmentalism is not a pejorative word compared to women, and slut-shaming may have a positive connotation with men depending on context and relationship.

See also 
 Female intrasexual competition
 Free the nipple
 Honor killing
 Madonna–whore complex
 Post-assault treatment of sexual assault victims
 Sexual bullying
 Victim blaming

References

External links 

Bullying
Feminism and sexuality
Feminist terminology
Feminist theory
Misogyny
Sexuality and society
Prejudice and discrimination
Birth control